The McDermott Center is a 2,000-seat multi-purpose arena in San Antonio, Texas on the campus of the University of the Incarnate Word.  Built in 1989, it is home to the Incarnate Word Cardinals men's and women's basketball teams and the women's volleyball team.

See also
 List of NCAA Division I basketball arenas

References

Incarnate Word Cardinals men's basketball
College basketball venues in the United States
Basketball venues in Texas
Indoor arenas in Texas
Volleyball venues in Texas
Sports venues in San Antonio